William Baldock (1815 – 23 June 1878) was an English first-class cricketer.

The son of William Henry Baldock, was born in Kent at Bapchild and made his debut in first-class cricket for the Gentlemen of Kent against the Gentlemen of England at Lord's in 1842. He made a further seven appearances in the fixture between 1842–49, scoring 127 runs in his eight first-class matches for the Gentlemen of Kent, which he made at an average of 10.58 and with a high score of 28. In addition to playing first-class cricket, Baldock also served in the 35th (Royal Sussex) Regiment of Foot, having formerly served in the East Kent Yeomanry from 1840 as a cornet. Baldock died at Surbiton in June 1878, and was survived by his son, William junior, who played first-class cricket for Hampshire. His grandson, also called William, played first-class cricket for Somerset.

References

External links

1815 births
1878 deaths
People from the Borough of Swale
Royal East Kent Yeomanry officers
English cricketers
Gentlemen of Kent cricketers
35th Regiment of Foot officers